Gould City is an unincorporated community in Garfield County, in the U.S. state of Washington.

History
Gould City was laid out in 1891. A post office called Gould City was established in 1891, and remained in operation until 1913.

References

External links

Unincorporated communities in Garfield County, Washington
Unincorporated communities in Washington (state)